Lunger may refer to:

 Lunger (surname), a surname
 Lunger, someone with tuberculosis

See also

 Linger (disambiguation)
 "Longer"
 Lungern